You Are Wanted is a German drama series directed and produced by and starring Matthias Schweighöfer, first released on 17 March 2017 by Amazon Video, the first foreign-language Amazon Original Series to be released globally.

The series was written and created by Hanno Hackfort, Bob Konrad and Richard Kropf.

A second season was commissioned by Amazon in March 2017 and was released on 18 May 2018. The second season features Jessica Schwarz, Hannah Hoekstra and Michael Landes as new characters.

Plot 
Lukas Franke (Matthias Schweighöfer), a hotel manager in Berlin, is the victim of a cyber attack and has his online data altered to implicate him as a member of a terrorist-activist group. He searches for the people responsible to prove his innocence, but his friends, family and colleagues begin to doubt him. He discovers another hacking victim, Lena Arandt (Karoline Herfurth), whom he tries to work with to find out the truth.

Meanwhile, police investigator Sandra Jansen (Catrin Striebeck) is leading the investigation into Franke alongside her partner Thorsten Siebert (Edin Hasanovic), whilst the German Federal Intelligence Service, the BND, also begin to get involved.

Cast 

 Matthias Schweighöfer as Lukas Franke
 Alexandra Maria Lara as Hanna Franke
 Catrin Striebeck as Sandra Jensen
 Franz Hagn as Leon Franke
 Karoline Herfurth as Lena Aradnt
 Tom Beck as Marc Wessling
 Thomas Schmauser as Frank Jeryczek/Jens Kaufmann
 Jörg Pintsch as Thomas Franke
 Alexander Khuon as Johnny
 Louis Hofmann as Dalton
 Lucie Aron as Vero
 Markus Gertken as Lorenz
 Edin Hasanovic as Thorsten Siebert
 Katrin Bauerfeind as Julia Gracht
 Lorna Ishema as Dilara Dogan
 Aleksandar Jovanovic as Case
 Dejan Bucin as Blaschko
 Ulrich Drewes as Lippel

Episodes

Reception

Awards 

 Golden Trailer Awards - Best Foreign (TV Spot/Trailer/Teaser for a Series) (GTA18/2017) - Nominee
 Romy Award 2018 Ceremony - Preis der Jury [Prize of the Jury] - Winner

Soundtrack 
A soundtrack album featuring original music composed by Josef Bach and Arne Schumann, as well as songs by Simon Hughes, Tina Pepper, Chester Travis and Walking on Cars, was released alongside the series on 17 March 2017.

Track listing

References

External links 
 
 You Are Wanted on Rotten Tomatoes
 You Are Wanted on Facebook

2017 German television series debuts
2018 German television series endings
Amazon Prime Video original programming
Television series by Warner Bros. Television Studios